Class and No Class is a 1921 British silent comedy film directed by W. P. Kellino and starring Judd Green, Pauline Johnson and David Hawthorne. It was based on a novel by E. Newton-Bungey.

Cast
 Judd Green as Jeremy Russell
 Pauline Johnson as Nancy
 David Hawthorne as Dick Foster
 Marie Ault as Liza Ann
 Tom Coventry as Sam West
 Cecil del Gue as Colonel Sir John Gatfield JP
 Cyril Smith as Lord Daventry

References

Bibliography
 Low, Rachael. History of the British Film, 1918–1929. George Allen & Unwin, 1971.

1921 films
1921 comedy films
British comedy films
British silent feature films
Films based on British novels
Films directed by W. P. Kellino
Films shot at Lime Grove Studios
British black-and-white films
1920s English-language films
1920s British films
Silent comedy films